John McFarland is an American former Negro league pitcher who played in the 1940s.

McFarland played for the New York Black Yankees in 1944 and again in 1947. In ten recorded career appearances on the mound, he posted an 11.57 ERA over 25.2 innings.

References

External links
 and Seamheads

Year of birth missing
Place of birth missing
New York Black Yankees players